The Société royale belge des aquarellistes is an association of watercolourists founded in 1856 in Brussels under the chairmanship of Jean-Baptiste Madou.

Creation of the society 
On 11 June 1856, sixteen painters, inspired by the Royal Watercolour Society created in 1804, met in Brussels to found a similar society. Jean-Baptiste Madou was its first president. The number of its members was initially limited to twenty, but it is then increased to thirty and later to forty.

Activities 
The main purpose of the society was to hold annual exhibitions. These exhibitions were held at the Hôtel d'Assche (Place des Palais), the Hôtel Arconati-Visconti (Place Royale), Palais Ducal (currently the Palais des Académies) and, from 1880 at the new Palais des Beaux- arts (currently Royal Museums of Fine Arts of Belgium) then, from 1890, to the Museum of Modern Art. Famous watercolorists working abroad are invited to become honorary members. The Society invites one or more renowned non-Belgian watercolorists to each exhibition and grants them admission as honorary member.

References 

Learned societies of Belgium